The Wesermünde Geest (Northern Low Saxon: Wersermünner Geest) is the collective name for several geest ridges in the west of Cuxhaven district and Bremen's  in northern Germany. The ridges are separated from one another by wetlands.

Location 
The Wesermünde is bounded to the south by the River Lesum in the northern part of Bremen,
To the north, the Wesermünde Geest is bordered by the Land Hadeln, part of the Elbe marshes, and the Elbe estuary near Cuxhaven. Its eastern boundary is formed by the rivers Oste, as far as the town of Bremervörde, and Hamme with the great bog of the Teufelsmoor near Osterholz-Scharmbeck. East of these rivers is the Zeven Geest that, like the Wesermünde Geest, is part of the natural region of the Stade Geest. 

The part lying south of the Lune is called the Osterholz Geest and lies mostly in the district of Osterholz. Numerous geest perimeter streams rise here, including the Giehler Bach which forms the headstream of the Hamme, and the Drepte.

The northern part of the Wesermünde Geest lies for the most part within the district of Cuxhaven.

Landscape and vegetation 
In addition to intensive grazing, the geest is also used for arable farming. In addition, its numerous pine woods are used for forestry. The raised bogs in the northern part of the geest have had their peat deposits almost completely removed. On the higher elevations, there are also near-natural deciduous forests and many areas of heathland. The countless rivers and streams that cut through the ridges of the geest, form shallow valleys in which blanket bogs are found.

Name 
The name Wesermünde Geest goes back to the former independent Prussian town of Wesermünde, that between 1924 and 1947 made up the largest part of the present city of Bremerhaven. On 1 August 1977 the district of Wesermünde was disbanded and replaced by the newly created district of Cuxhaven. The name Wesermünde Geest, occasionally used in the 1920s and 1930s, is very uncommon.

References 

Geography of Bremen (state)
Regions of Lower Saxony
Geest